Burp Castle is a beer bar located in the East Village neighborhood of Manhattan in New York City. It is ostensibly "monastery-themed". Bartenders occasionally wear monastic robes, play Gregorian chants, and patrons are shushed if they speak above a whisper. The bar is located near the site of the 2015 East Village gas explosion, and it was forced to close for several weeks before occupancy was proved to once again be safe. 

SoundPrint, an app that measures noise produced in restaurants and bars, lists Burp Castle as a particularly quiet location.

References

Restaurants in Manhattan
East Village, Manhattan
1992 establishments in New York City
Beer in New York City